Joseph Adam may refer to:
 Joseph Adam (athlete) (born 1965), Seychellois sprinter
 Joseph Johann Adam (1690–1732), Prince of Liechtenstein
 Joe Adam, American football coach

See also
 Joseph Adams (disambiguation)